Ansis Brūns (born 30 March 1989 in Ventspils) is a Latvian javelin thrower.

His current personal best throw is 81.28 metres, which was set at the 2014 European Athletics Championships.

With a throw results of 75.31 metres, he won a bronze medal at the 2008 World Junior Championships in Bydgoszcz, Poland.

In his youth years Ansis usually competed in decathlon, switching to javelin only later on.

International competitions

Personal bests

Seasonal bests by year
2007 - 72.40
2008 - 75.31
2009 - 78.82
2010 - 79.35
2011 - 80.40
2012 - 75.00
2014 - 81.28

References

1989 births
Living people
Latvian male javelin throwers